Loreto (Misiones) is a village and municipality in Misiones Province in north-eastern Argentina.

References

Populated places in Misiones Province